John Ely may refer to:

John Ely (baseball) (born 1986), pitcher with the Los Angeles Dodgers
John Ely (representative) (1774–1849), U.S. Representative from New York

John Hart Ely (1938–2003), American legal scholar
John Ely (Iowa politician) (1919–2007), Iowa state legislator
John J. Ely (1778–1852), American politician in New Jersey
John Ely (surgeon) American Revolutinary War surgeon and colonel